Pink rot is a fungal disease of various plants, caused by various organisms:

 Phytophthora erythroseptica – pink rot of potatoes, carrots (tubers)
 Trichothecium roseum – pink rot of apples, grapes, avocadoes, peaches, nectarines (fruit)
 Nalanthamala vermoeseni or Gliocladium vermoeseni – pink rot of date palm (inflorescence)